Mount St. Ursula or Plešivec is the easternmost peak of the Karawanks. It lies between the towns of Slovenj Gradec and Črna na Koroškem. There are three villages on the slopes of the mountain: Uršlja Gora, Podgora, and Zgornji Razbor. The mountain offers a panoramic view towards all of Carinthia, the Kozjak Mountains, and the Kamnik–Savinja Alps. Below the peak of Mount St. Ursula stands the Gothic St. Ursula's Church (which gives the mountain its name and is the highest-standing church in Slovenia), a TV mast tower, a mountain lodge (the Mount St. Ursula Lodge)), and a monument to the soldiers fallen in World War I.. The name Plešivec (literally, 'the bald one') derives from its grey limestone peak.

Starting points 
 Postmen's Lodge Below Plešivec (2 h 30 min)
 Naravske Fallows Hut (1 h 45 min)
 The Gate - by road (45 min)
 Lake Ivartnik (2 h 30 min)
 Ciganija (2 h 30 min)

Mast tower 

The Radiotelevizija Slovenija mast tower was built in 1962. The site allows for optimal TV broadcasting towards Carinthia and Styria. It has also been used by firemen, the police, mountain rescuers, and others.

Gallery

References 
 Javornik, Marjan. Enciklopedija Slovenije.Mladinska knjiga, Ljubljana 1987–2002. Pg. 100. .
 Jurij, Pivka in Galun, Nataša. Štajerska. Sidarta, Ljubljana, 2001. Pp. 61–63. 
 Radovanovič, Sašo. Bevc Varl, Valentina in Žiberna, Igor. Koroška : A-Ž : priročnik za popotnika in poslovnega človeka. Pomurska založba. Murska Sobota, 1999. Pp. 141, 142.

See also 
Slovene Mountain Hiking Trail
List of mountains in Slovenia

External links

 Photos, Routes & Description

St Ursula
Karawanks
St Ursula